Arnold Bruce Beran (born August 8, 1935) is a retired United States Coast Guard vice admiral. He served as Commander of the Coast Guard Pacific Area, Chief of Staff of the United States Coast Guard and Commanding Officer of the U.S. Coast Guard Headquarters.

References

1935 births
Living people
United States Coast Guard admirals